The South Milwaukee Post Office is a Neoclassical-styled U.S. Post office built in South Milwaukee, Wisconsin in 1931. It was added to the National Register of Historic Places in 2000.

History
Designed under James A. Wetmore, the building has brick walls sitting on a limestone foundation. The front entrance passes through a colonnade of eight Ionic columns. A fallout shelter was built inside of it.

References

Post office buildings on the National Register of Historic Places in Wisconsin
Buildings and structures in Milwaukee County, Wisconsin
Neoclassical architecture in Wisconsin
Limestone buildings in the United States
Government buildings completed in 1931
National Register of Historic Places in Milwaukee County, Wisconsin